Mihai Cristian Căpățînă (born 16 December 1995) is a Romanian professional footballer who plays as a midfielder for Liga I club CS Universitatea Craiova.

Career statistics

Club

Honours
FC Voluntari
Cupa României: 2016–17
Supercupa României: 2017

Universitatea Craiova
Cupa României: 2020–21
Supercupa României: 2021

References

External links
 
 

1995 births
Living people
Sportspeople from Slatina, Romania
Romanian footballers
Association football midfielders
FC Olt Slatina players
Liga I players
Liga II players
FC Voluntari players
CS Universitatea Craiova players